Norbert Magosi (born 10 April 1975)) is a Hungarian former motorcycle speedway rider. He is a four times national champion of Hungary.

Career
Magosi was a member of Hungary's national team. In 2011, he won the Argentine Championship.

Magosi rode in the British leagues for Peterborough Panthers and Berwick Bandits.

References

See also 
 Hungary national speedway team

1975 births
Living people
Hungarian speedway riders
Berwick Bandits riders
Peterborough Panthers riders